John William Kavanaugh is an American composer, lyricist and musical director who is currently serving as songwriter for Disney Television Animation. He is the recipient of 7 Emmy nominations and was awarded the 2014 Daytime Emmy Award for Sofia The First Main Title theme song with co-lyricist Craig Gerber.  While working on Sofia The First, John was tapped to write songs for Disney's First Latina princess, the award-winning Elena of Avalor. John is now penning the songs and serving as music director on the series Alice's Wonderland Bakery which premiered in February of 2022.

His songs can also be heard in several hit movies, including Disney's Descendants 3 (My Once Upon a Time), Winnie The Pooh film Springtime with Roo and Nickelodeon's Globehunters. He co-wrote the scores to Curious George Live for NBC Universal, Dreams are Universal for Universal Studios Japan, Flintstones: The Musical for Universal Studios Hollywood, as well as numerous songs for Sesame Street Live and Tokyo DisneySea.  With lyricist Marcy Heisler, John wrote the song Joseph's Lullaby for Michael Crawford which appears on his album On Eagle's Wings.

Personal life
John, (John William Kavanaugh) is the son of Edward Houston Kavanaugh and Eileen Kirby Gunn and is the youngest of six children.  He grew up in Norfolk, Virginia and developed his passion for music by watching his mother play the piano and create/direct many variety shows in Norfolk.  He graduated from Rollins College in Winter Park, Florida and began working at Disney World in 1983. He then moved to Los Angeles in 1986 to work for Disneyland where he soon began his composing career writing for theatre and theme parks worldwide.

He is currently married to Efren Gonzalez and resides in Los Angeles, California.

Awards

Articles
http://www.orlandosentinel.com/entertainment/tv/tv-guy/os-disney-composer-serves-two-heroines-20161205-story.html

References

External links

American film score composers
Living people
Place of birth missing (living people)
Year of birth missing (living people)
Video game composers
Disney music
Animation composers